Archana Sharma, also credited as Ayshickka Sharma, is an Indian actress and model, who appears in Kollywood and Tollywood films. She made her acting debut in Thozhi (2009). She is currently pursuing her MBA from ISBR Chennai.

Career
Sharma hails from Bihar. She was born in Bangalore and lived in Mumbai before she came to Chennai. Before she became an actress, she did modelling. She has done over forty commercials, which include ads for Francis Alukkas jewellery and textiles in Chennai and Kerala, RmKV, Univercell mobiles, City Union Bank and Pigeon cooker.
She completed her engineering in Computer Science from Saveetha Engineering college, thandalam, chennai
She is trained in Martial arts and has received the Black Belt. She is also a trained Bharatanatyam dancer. She is doing her MBA from ISBR Chennai.

She was introduced by director Elango Lakshmanan in the Tamil film Thozhi (2009). She later acted in S. A. Chandrasekhar's Veluthu Kattu and with Jai Akash in Othigai. She made her Tollywood debut with R. P. Patnaik's Friends Book. She will make her Malayalam debut with Second Innings. She acts as Parvathy Maria Columbus who is in love with Manu Madhav, played by Rajeev Pillai. While shooting a song at Peermade, she and her co-star Rajeev Pillai almost fell off a cliff.

Filmography

References

Indian film actresses
Actresses in Tamil cinema
Actresses in Telugu cinema
Living people
21st-century Indian actresses
Actresses from Bangalore
1986 births
Actresses in Malayalam cinema